The Daytime Emmy Award for Outstanding Digital Daytime Drama Series was an award presented by the National Academy of Television Arts and Sciences (NATAS) and Academy of Television Arts & Sciences (ATAS).

The first incarnation of the award was the Daytime Emmy Award for Outstanding Special Class Short Format Daytime, which was given to the soap opera web series Venice: The Series at the 38th Daytime Emmy Awards in 2011. The category became Outstanding New Approaches Original Daytime Program or Series in 2013, and evolved into Outstanding New Approaches Drama Series in 2014. It was renamed Outstanding Digital Daytime Drama Series in 2016. In 2015, Alina Adams of Entertainment Weekly attributed the addition and evolution of the category to the increasing audience for, and presence of, independent soap opera web series.

The associated category Outstanding Performer in a New Approaches Drama Series was added for the 42nd Daytime Creative Arts Emmy Awards in 2015, with Martha Byrne the first recipient for her role as Alexis Jordan/Joanne Edwards on Anacostia. In 2016, this was split into two categories, Outstanding Actress in a Digital Daytime Drama Series and Outstanding Actor in a Digital Daytime Drama Series, with Mary Beth Evans and Kristos Andrews winning for their mother-son roles of Sara and Peter Garrett on The Bay. These performer categories were further expanded to four for the 44th Daytime Creative Arts Emmy Awards: Outstanding Lead Actress in a Digital Daytime Drama Series, Outstanding Lead Actor in a Digital Daytime Drama Series, Outstanding Supporting or Guest Actress in a Digital Daytime Drama Series, and Outstanding Supporting or Guest Actor in a Digital Daytime Drama Series. In 2018, the Outstanding Supporting or Guest Actress/Actor in a Digital Daytime Drama Series categories became Outstanding Supporting Actress/Actor in a Digital Daytime Drama Series, and a fifth performer category was added, Outstanding Guest Performer in a Digital Daytime Drama Series. New categories were also added for Outstanding Writing in a Digital Drama Series and Outstanding Directing in a Digital Drama Series.

To be eligible for the Outstanding Digital Daytime Drama Series category, programming was required to be "continuous, episodic works of dramatic fiction from over-the-air, cable, satellite and internet broadcasters" which have more than three but less than 35 original episodes; 35 episodes was the minimum required for the main Daytime Emmy Award for Outstanding Drama Series category. The award recognized producers, directors, and writers credited on a minimum of 19 percent of total episodes first aired in the applicable year. The performer categories applied to actresses and actors who appeared in these series. The Digital Daytime Drama Series and related performer awards were typically awarded as part of the Creative Arts Emmy Awards ceremony, a separate presentation of awards which included recognition of technical and craft categories.

In December 2021, the ATAS and the NATAS announced a major realignment of the Daytime and Primetime Emmy Award ceremonies. Other than daytime serial dramas (as defined as an episodic, multi-camera drama serial that airs on a weekday basis, or a reboot or spin-off of such a series) or children's programming (which will move to the new Children's & Family Emmy Awards), all categories for scripted comedies and dramas will now fall under Primetime Emmys, regardless of scheduling.

Winners and nominees

The winner in each category is in bold.

Notes

References

External links
 Daytime Emmy Awards

Retired Daytime Emmy Awards
Awards established in 2011
Awards disestablished in 2021